Sams Creek is a stream in St. Charles and Warren counties in the U.S. state of Missouri. It is a tributary of Peruque Creek.

Sams Creek possibly has the name of Sam Price, a pioneer citizen.

See also
List of rivers of Missouri

References

Rivers of St. Charles County, Missouri
Rivers of Warren County, Missouri
Rivers of Missouri